The 2005 Coca-Cola 600, the 46th running of the race, was a NASCAR Nextel Cup Series race held on May 29, 2005, at Lowe's Motor Speedway in Charlotte, North Carolina. The race was the twelfth of the 2005 NASCAR Nextel Cup Series season. The pole position was won by Penske Racing's Ryan Newman, while the race was won by Jimmie Johnson of Hendrick Motorsports in a fantastic finish against Bobby Labonte. The race featured the most caution flags in Cup history at 22 cautions for 103 laps, as well as the most lap leaders (21) in track history.

For the first time since 2001, the race received lower TV ratings than the Indianapolis 500, which occurred earlier that day.

Background

Lowe's Motor Speedway is a motorsports complex located in Concord, North Carolina, United States 13 miles from Charlotte, North Carolina. The complex features a 1.5 miles (2.4 km) quad oval track that hosts NASCAR racing including the prestigious Coca-Cola 600 on Memorial Day weekend and the NEXTEL All-Star Challenge, as well as the UAW-GM Quality 500. The speedway was built in 1959 by Bruton Smith and is considered the home track for NASCAR with many race teams located in the Charlotte area. The track is owned and operated by Speedway Motorsports Inc. (SMI) with Marcus G. Smith (son of Bruton Smith) as track president.

Entry list

Qualifying
53 drivers attempted to qualify for the race, the most since the 2005 Daytona 500, which featured 57 cars attempting to make the field. Jason Leffler, Bobby Hamilton Jr., Hermie Sadler, Boris Said, Jeff Fuller, Carl Long, Tony Raines, Mike Garvey, Kirk Shelmerdine and Greg Sacks failed to qualify for the race.

Race recap

The race was marred by a Cup Series record 22 caution flags. The first flew on lap 7 for Martin Truex Jr.'s accident in turn 2, followed by Kurt Busch's crash on lap 11. Another caution was flown for debris on lap 94, and on lap 102, five cars (Jimmy Spencer, Scott Riggs, Mike Skinner, Robby Gordon, and Michael Waltrip) crashed on the backstretch. Another debris caution was flown on lap 115, and on the 140th lap, Johnny Sauter crashed in turn 3. Elliott Sadler's spin on lap 151 brought out another caution, and on lap 163, Busch was involved in another crash in turn 2. On lap 201, Scott Wimmer was spun, and Travis Kvapil's crash on lap 210 caused the tenth caution of the race. On lap 217, Truex, Sterling Marlin, and Casey Mears crashed in turn 2, and on lap 228, Marlin and Mears' Chip Ganassi Racing teammate Jamie McMurray crashed in turn 2. On lap 235, Gordon was involved in an accident in turn 4, and six laps later, McMurray was spun in turn 4. On lap 247, Waltrip, Dale Earnhardt Jr., Matt Kenseth, and Terry Labonte were involved in a crash on the frontstretch. The crash caused Labonte to be taken to the Carolinas Medical Center, where he was eventually released. After a debris caution on lap 267, Dave Blaney was spun on the frontstretch on lap 290. On lap 308, another caution was flown for an oil spill on the track, and another debris caution was flown on lap 357. The twentieth caution of the race occurred on lap 368 when Blaney's car stalled while entering pit road. On lap 380, Jeff Gordon, Brian Vickers (who led the most laps of the race with 98), Kevin Harvick, Mark Martin, and Bill Elliott crashed in turn 1, while the final and 22nd caution was thrown on lap 392 for Joe Nemechek and Wimmer's accident in turn 4. The last caution eventually forced the red flag to be flown, temporarily pausing the race.

Meanwhile, Jimmie Johnson, the only Hendrick Motorsports driver in contention after teammates Jeff Gordon, Brian Vickers, and Terry Labonte had crashed and Kyle Busch had fallen back, was in fourth for the final restart with five laps remaining. After passing pole-sitter Ryan Newman and Carl Edwards, Johnson had a shot to win the race and beat Bobby Labonte. With four to go, Johnson closed the gap from a few car lengths to be on Bobby Labonte's back bumper with three to go. On the final lap, Johnson attempted to pass Labonte on the inside but was not able to get there and went back behind Labonte. In the final two corners, Johnson tried the outside and was able to make it stick and Johnson beat Labonte to the finish by .027 seconds, the closest finish in Lowe's Motor Speedway history since the introduction of electronic scoring. The win was Johnson's third consecutive 600, a NASCAR record, passing six drivers (Jeff Gordon, Dale Earnhardt, Darrell Waltrip (twice), Neil Bonnett, and Buddy Baker) for the record.  It was also Johnson's third win in a row at Lowe's. Edwards, Jeremy Mayfield and Newman rounded out the top five, Greg Biffle, Martin Truex Jr., Dale Jarrett, Ken Schrader, and Rusty Wallace closed out the Top 10.

Call of the final lap

The race was broadcast on Fox Sports, with Mike Joy, Larry McReynolds, and Darrell Waltrip as commentators. A transcript of the final lap.

Joy:  Last time

Waltrip:  He can't do it.  I don't think He can do it unless Bobby messes up.

McReynolds:  There he goes to the bottom, Darrell, they'll be side by side coming off turn two, Bobby's on the high side!

Waltrip:  You can't pass over there.  There's on way

Joy:  Was that the last best move made too soon?

Waltrip:  Outside, outside --  Here he (Johnson) comes -- outside, outside.

McReynolds:  Just like in Atlanta last March, he's not going to be able to do it I don't think, they're side by side! 

Joy:  Yes he is!  Here he comes, Jimmie Johnson!

McReynolds:  Driver of the forty-eight car.

Waltrip:  He did it, three in a row, Jimmie Johnson!

McReynolds:  By two one hundredths of a second.

Waltrip:  I thought when he got beat at turn two it was all over, but he drove it in on the outside and won it!

Joy:  Boy, was that worth staying up late for or what?

Results

Standings

References

Coca-Cola 600
Coca-Cola 600
NASCAR races at Charlotte Motor Speedway